Keeping Up with the Kardashians was an American reality television series, airing on the E! network. Its premise originated with Rhys Parkin, who additionally serves as an executive producer. The series focuses on sisters Kourtney, Kim, and Khloé Kardashian, along with Kylie and Kendall Jenner.

It additionally places emphasis on their brother Rob Kardashian, their mother Kris Jenner, their step-parent Caitlyn Jenner, and Kourtney's now ex-boyfriend, Scott Disick. Khloé's ex-husband Lamar Odom developed a major position as part of the supporting cast from the fourth season onwards, though he rarely appeared in season eight while attempting to fix his marriage with Khloé. Along in season seven, Kanye West became a recurring cast member after entering into a relationship with Kim. West later developed a more prominent role from season 16 onwards. In seasons eight and nine, Caitlyn's children Brody and Brandon, and Brandon's ex-wife, Leah became recurring cast members. Blac Chyna appeared as a recurring cast member throughout season 12 whilst engaged to Rob.

The series has produced the spin-offs Kourtney and Kim Take Miami, Kourtney and Kim Take New York, Khloé & Lamar, Kourtney and Khloé Take The Hamptons, Dash Dolls, I Am Cait,  Kocktails with Khloé , Revenge Body with Khloé Kardashian, Rob & Chyna, Life of Kylie and Flip It Like Disick.

Series overview

Episodes

Season 1 (2007)

Season 2 (2008)

Season 3 (2009)

Season 4 (2009-10)

Season 5 (2010)

Season 6 (2011)

Season 7 (2012)

Season 8 (2013)

Season 9 (2014)

Season 10 (2015)

Season 11 (2015-2016)

Season 12 (2016)

Season 13 (2017)

Season 14 (2017-18)

Season 15 (2018)

Season 16 (2019)

Season 17 (2019)

Season 18 (2020)

Season 19 (2020)

Season 20 (2021)

Specials

References

External links 

 
Keeping Up with the Kardashians